Futsal competition at the 2022 Bolivarian Games in Valledupar, Colombia will be held from 25 to 29 June 2022 at the Coliseo de Ferias.

The men's tournament is the only event scheduled to be contested. A total of 72 athletes (12 per team) will compete in the event. The tournament was an open competition without age restrictions.

Hosts Colombia are the defending gold medalists.

Participating nations
A total of 6 nations (3 ODEBO nations and 3 invited) registered teams for the futsal event. Each nation was able to enter a maximum of 12 athletes in their squad.

Medal summary

Medal table

Medalists

Venue
All matches will be played at Coliseo de Ferias Luis Alberto Monsalvo Ramírez in Valledupar, with a capacity for 3,000 spectators.

Men's tournament

The tournament consists of a single group of 6 teams in which each team will play once against the other 5 teams in the group on a single round-robin basis. The top three teams will be awarded gold, silver and bronze medals respectively.

All match times are in COT (UTC−5).

Standings

Matches

Notes

References

External links
Bolivarianos Valledupar 2022 Futsal

Futsal
2022 Bolivarian Games
Bolivarian Games
Bolivarian Games